U.S. Route 421 (US 421) enters Indiana from Kentucky, proceeding northwest to Indianapolis, joining Interstate 465, and then continuing northwest to Michigan City.

US 421 winds through the southern part of Indiana as it runs from Madison, in the southeastern part of the state, to Indianapolis (the capital).  North of Greensburg, US 421 intersects and merges with I-74 west, through the Shelbyville area en route to Indianapolis.  Originally, US 421 followed Michigan Road into Indianapolis,  which turns into Southeastern Avenue and heads to downtown. US 421 then merged with US 40 (Washington St.) and headed to West Street, then turned north, following West Street, Northwestern Avenue (later Martin Luther King Jr. Street), and Michigan Road up to the northwest side of the city.  US 421 passed an Indianapolis landmark, the Pyramids.  North of Indianapolis, US 421 continues to the north-northwest, providing a direct highway link between Indianapolis and Michigan City.  US 421 ends at its junction with US 20 on the south side of Michigan City. Originally, the highway's end was a few miles north at the junction with US 12 near the shores of Lake Michigan.

Route description

Kentucky state line to Indianapolis 
US 421 enters Indiana from Kentucky over the Ohio River.  After crossing the Ohio River US 421 has a short concurrency with State Road 56 (SR 56).  After the concurrency with SR 56 ends US 421 becomes a four-lane highway.  US 421 has an intersection with State Road 62 (SR 62).  North of Madison US 421 becomes a two-lane highway, heading north then northeast.  US 421 heads towards Versailles, passing through an intersection with State Road 250 (SR 250).  In Versailles US 421 has a concurrency with State Road 129 that ends at U.S. Route 50 (US 50).  US 421 heads west out of Versailles concurrent with US 50.  West of Varsailles US 421 heads northwest, towards Greensburg.  US 421 passes through Osgood and Napoleon, passing through intersections with State Road 350 (SR 350) and SR 229.  US 421 enters Greensburg on the southeast side of town and heads to the northwest side of town.  In Greensburg US 421 is concurrent with State Road 46 (SR 46) and intersects State Road 3 (SR 3).  On the northwest side of Greensburg US 421 joins Interstate 74 (I-74).  I-74/US 421 heads northwest towards Indianapolis, passing near Shelbyville.  Near Shelbyville I-74/US 421 has interchanges with State Road 44 (SR 44) and State Road 9 (SR 9).  I-74/US 421 enters Indianapolis on the southeast side of the city.  US 421 heads north and west around Indianapolis, concurrent with Interstate 465.

Indianapolis to Monticello 
US 421 is concurrent with I-465, until the northwest side of the city.  US 421 leaves I-465 heading northwest.  US 421 becomes a two-lane highway, heading through intersections with State Road 32 (SR 32), State Road 47 (SR 47), State Road 38 (SR 38), and State Road 29 (SR 29), and has a concurrency with State Road 28 (SR 28).  US 421 and SR 28 enter Frankfort heading west; the concurrency ends when US 421 heads north concurrent with State Road 38 (SR 38) and State Road 39 (SR 39).  US 421/SR 38/SR 39 heads northwest out of Frankfort, and  later SR 38 heads due west.  US 421/SR 39 heads northwest towards Delphi passing through an intersection with State Road 26 (SR 26).  In Delphi US 421/SR 39 are concurrent with State Road 25 (SR 25).  US 421/SR 39 heads northwest out of Delphi passing through Pittsburg.  West of Pittsburg US 421/SR 39 heads due north towards Monticello.  In Monticello the concurrency with SR 39 ends with SR 39 heading east on U.S. Route 24 and US 421 heading west on US 24. US 24/US 421 heads north towards Reynolds, where US 24 heads west and US 421 heads due north.

Monticello to Michigan City 
After the concurrency with US 24, US 421 runs into mostly rural areas as it leaves White County and enters Pulaski County, turning from a northwest trajectory to a due north one. It enters the tiny town of Francesville where it shares a couple of junctions and concurrencies. Just before leaving Pulaski County, US 421 crosses into the unincorporated community of Radioville. After that, it exits Pulaski County and enters Starke County, which also marks the border of Eastern Time and Central Time Zones. 

US 421 heads north towards Michigan City, passing through Monon, Wanatah, and Westville.  US 421 has intersections with State Road 16 (SR 16), State Road 114 (SR 114), State Road 143 (SR 143), State Road 8 (SR 8), and U.S. Route 30 (US 30).  US 421 has concurrencies with State Road 14 (SR 14), State Road 10 (SR 10), U.S. Route 6 (US 6), and State Road 2 (SR 2).  US 421 has interchanges with Interstate 80/Interstate 90 and Interstate 94.  US 421's northern terminus is at U.S. Route 20 (US 20) in Michigan City.

History 
Before US 421 was commissioned in Indiana, the route from Madison to Boyleston was SR 29.  This is why SR 129 and State Road 229 (SR 229) have concurrency or terminus at US 421.  US 421 from Reynolds to Michigan City was originally State Road 43 (SR 43).  This is the reason for SR 143 having its eastern terminus at US 421.

Madison 
US 421 passed through downtown Madison and headed northwest out of Madison. A new route was built east of the old route.  The old route was designated State Road 107 until it was decommissioned.

Indianapolis 
US 421 entered Indianapolis on the southeast side of the city and went through downtown.  US 421 was routed on Southeastern Avenue, Washington Street, Northwestern Avenue (now Martin Luther King Jr. Street), and Michigan Road.

Michigan City 
US 421 went through Michigan City to U.S. Route 12 (US 12) near Lake Michigan.  Then INDOT moved the northern terminus of US 421 south to US 20, on the south side of Michigan City.

Major intersections

See also

References

External links 

21-4
Transportation in Marion County, Indiana
Transportation in Indianapolis
Transportation in Jefferson County, Indiana
Transportation in Ripley County, Indiana
Transportation in Decatur County, Indiana
Transportation in Shelby County, Indiana
Transportation in Boone County, Indiana
Transportation in Clinton County, Indiana
Transportation in Carroll County, Indiana
Transportation in White County, Indiana
Transportation in Pulaski County, Indiana
Transportation in Starke County, Indiana
Transportation in LaPorte County, Indiana
 Indiana